Kirundu may refer to:
 Kirundu, Kenya, a settlement in Kenya's Central Province
 Kirundu, Democratic Republic of the Congo, a settlement on the right bank of the Lualaba River